Torchlight is an American 1985 film directed by Thomas J. Wright and starring Pamela Sue Martin.

Premise
A young married couple's relationship comes under fire when the husband becomes addicted to cocaine.

References

External links

1985 films
1985 drama films
Films about drugs
Cocaine
1985 directorial debut films
1980s English-language films
American romantic drama films
1980s American films